The 2017 Sky Blue FC season is the team's eighth season as a professional women's soccer team. Sky Blue FC plays in the National Women's Soccer League, the top tier of women's soccer in the United States.

Review

After a 7th-place finish in 2016, Sky Blue FC finished the 2017 season in 6th place, five points out of playoff contention. Sam Kerr scored a league-record 17 goals, won the league's Golden Boot award, and was named MVP, the first time a player on a non-playoff team had won the award.

Raquel Rodriguez set the NWSL record for fastest goal scored with a 25-second strike against Portland Thorns FC on June 17.

Head coach Christy Holly resigned mid-season on August 16, and was replaced by four assistant coaches, Jill Loyden, Dave Hodgson, Paul Greig, and Maria Dorris. A full-time replacement for Holly was not announced until November 15, 2017, when Sky Blue FC hired Washington Spirit assistant coach and former Jersey Sky Blue head coach Denise Reddy.

Soon after Holly's resignation, center back and team captain Christie Rampone announced that she would miss the rest of the season due to an accumulation of injuries.

Team

First-team roster

Competitions

National Women's Soccer League

Preseason

Regular season

League table

Results summary

Results by round

Honors and awards

NWSL Monthly Awards

NWSL Yearly Awards

NWSL Individual Awards

NWSL Player of the Month

NWSL Team of the Month

NWSL Weekly Awards

NWSL Player of the Week

NWSL Goal of the Week

NWSL Save of the Week

Statistics

References

Match reports (pre-season)

Match reports (regular season)

External links

See also

 2017 National Women's Soccer League season
 2017 in American soccer

Sky Blue FC
Sky Blue FC
NJ/NY Gotham FC seasons
Sky Blue FC